Nayau is an island of Fiji, a member of the Lau archipelago.  Nearby cities: Suva; Nuku'Alofa;

Coordinates:   17°58'39"S   179°3'13"W.

Nayau, north of Lakeba, is one of the chiefly islands in the Lau Group with a unique and rich history.

Islands of Fiji
Lau Islands